Bands of America (BOA) is a music education advocacy organization and promoter of high school marching band competitions in the United States, such as the annual Grand National Championships. Established in 1975 as Marching Bands of America (MBA), founder Larry McCormick's goal was to provide educational opportunities for music students nationwide. McCormick organized the first annual Summer Workshop and Festival in 1976. Renamed Bands of America in 1984, the organization became an independent, tax-exempt entity in 1988. In 2006, Bands of America merged with the Music for All Foundation, a music education advocacy organization, becoming the flagship program of the combined organization. Bands of America has received numerous awards from IFEA.

Since 1975, Bands of America's various programs, services and events have served approximately 1.75 million music students. Approximately 450,000 spectators attend Bands of America championships every year. From 1980 to 1989, Bands of America hosted an annual Summer National Championship.

The adjudication manual and contest procedures utilized by Bands of America have been licensed to or adopted by other organizations. As a result, Bands of America sets standards for adjudication and competitive attributes of marching band competitions throughout the United States.

On July 21, 2020, Music for All's board of directors announced the cancellation of the 2020 competitive season in response to the coronavirus pandemic. Bands of America's schedule of championships, including Grand Nationals, continued in 2021.

History 
Larry McCormick established Marching Bands of America in 1975 as a subsidiary of McCormick's Enterprises, a music education supplies company. The goal was to provide a unique education and performance opportunity for music students nationwide. In 1976, Marching Bands of America hosted the first annual Summer Workshop and Festival on the campus of University of Wisconsin–Whitewater. Included in the program was the first Grand National Championship, whose inaugural champions were Kosciusko (Mississippi) and Live Oak (California) high schools. From 1980 onward, Grand National Championships were hosted in November. The Summer Workshop and Festival was relaunched as the Summer National Championships, which continued until 1989.

In 1983, Marching Bands of America was spun-off by McCormick's as Bands of America, Inc. L. Scott McCormick, son of founder Larry McCormick, was named CEO of the new Bands of America in 1985. In 1988, Bands of America was awarded tax-exempt status, retroactive to 1984. The Student Leadership Workshop began as part of the Summer Workshop and Festival in 1988, which was relaunched as the annual Summer Symposium in 1990. In 1992, the Summer Band Symposium became a resident program at Illinois State University. The symposium has since been hosted by Indiana University and Ball State University.

Bands of America began a recurring program of honor ensembles in 1992. The Honor Band of America's first performance was at the 1992 National Concert Band Festival established by Bands of America to rekindle the "concert band tradition in America as exemplified by the National Band Contest in the 1930s." The Honor Orchestra of America premiered at the National Concert Band Festival in 2005, launching the Orchestra of America program.

In 2006, Bands of America merged with the Music for All Foundation, a music education advocacy organization. Bands of America became a subsidiary of Music For All, and its flagship program, with L. Scott McCormick becoming the combined organization's CEO. Other programs operated by Bands of America, such as Orchestra and Honor Band of America, have been operated directly by Music for All since 2007.

Yamaha Corporation has been a corporate sponsor and presenting partner of Bands of America since 2003.

IFEA recognition 
From 1989 to 2006, Bands of America was recognized by the International Festivals and Events Association (IFEA) for excellence in promotional materials design and television production:
 1989 – Special recognition for the design of promotional materials.
 1990 – Two Gold Medals for print materials and promotional artwork.
 1993 – Three Gold Medals for newsletter and program book design.
 1994 – Four awards for newsletter and program book design.
 1995 – Gold Medal for newsletter design.
 1996 – Bronze Medal for website design, the former bands.org.
 1997 – Silver Medal for newsletter design.
 1998 – Gold Medal for Best Television Program for Grand National Championship production.
 1999 – Best Fundraising Program award for Grand National pin program.
 2000 – Four medals:
 Silver Medal for Best Newsletter.
 Bronze Medal for Best Website.
 Bronze Medal for Best Sponsor Solicitation Video Production.
 Bronze Medal for Best Television Production for Grand National Championship production.
 2001 – Silver Medal for Best Newsletter and Gold Medal for Best Sponsorship Video.
 2002 – Recognition with three Pinnacle Awards for promotional materials design and event promotion.
 2006 – Recognition with seven Pinnacle Awards for promotional materials design, television production, and event promotion.

Championship system 
All Bands of America championship events are open to all high school bands based in the United States on a first come first serve basis. There are no qualifications or prerequisites for participation. However, the Bands of America system is highly competitive. Bands receive a score which determines class rank and placement. Announcements place more emphasis on rankings between bands, such as advancing to the final round, versus a score. Promotional materials and programs often include essays on education philosophy and pedagogy from prominent music educators which highlight the festival atmosphere of each championship event, as well as exploring concepts such as the pursuit of excellence, and individual growth and achievement through competition. Spectators are encouraged to give each band participating in the final round a standing ovation.

Many bands have competed at championship events every year since 1978, such as Marian Catholic High School. Approximately 450,000 music students and their families, music educators, and spectators attend Bands of America championships every year.

Regional championships 
The regional championship program began in 1978 with events in Harrisonburg, Virginia and Jackson, Mississippi. Regionals are single-day events limited to a maximum of 32 bands in preliminary competition, with the ten highest scoring bands advancing to a final round. Regionals attract bands from the surrounding area, with many bands competing in more than one regional every year.

All 2020 Regional Championships were cancelled on July 21, 2020.

Super Regional championships 
In 2003, the San Antonio Regional was relaunched as a Super Regional Championship, a two-day event which included a national caliber adjudication panel, a maximum of 84 bands, with the fourteen highest scoring bands advancing to a final round. According to FloMarching, the caliber of bands at the San Antonio Super Regional is second only to Grand Nationals.

All 2020 Super Regional Championships were cancelled on July 21, 2020.

Past Super Regional venues 
The St. Louis and Atlanta Regional Championships were relaunched as Super Regionals in 2004. The Indiana Regional was relaunched as a Super Regional in 2011. The Alamodome is also site of the annual Texas state marching championship hosted by the University Interscholastic League, and Lucas Oil Stadium is also the site of the annual Indiana State School Music Association marching band championships. The Atlanta Super Regional Championship ended in 2017.

Grand National championships 
The Grand National championships are open to all high school bands. There are no qualifications or prerequisites for participation; a standard established by Larry McCormick at the first Summer Workshop and Festival in 1976. The format and terms for advancing to the semifinal and final competitions have changed since its inception.

, Grand Nationals are open to as many as 112 bands, with performances taking place over three days. All bands participate in a preliminary competition, split between two rounds. The highest scoring bands from each preliminary advance to a semifinal competition, and the twelve highest scoring bands advance to the final round. Class champions (A, AA, AAA, and AAAA) are announced following the semifinal, and the Grand National Champion is announced after the final.

The 2020 Grand National Championships were cancelled on July 21, 2020.

Championship trophy 
The Grand National Champion receives the championship trophy for one year. The trophy's base includes plaques for all previous champions, excluding the Summer National Champions. The trophy is capped by a white enameled eagle which was installed in 1995. A common phrase heard during the championship weekend is "who will take home the eagle?" Band's that have received the trophy have given the eagle a nickname

Past National venues 
From 1976 to 1979, Grand National Championships occurred in June. From 1980 onward, championships occurred in November. The June event was relaunched as the Summer National Championship which continued until 1989.

Future dates 
Dates for Grand Nationals have been announced up to 2025.

Classification and adjudication

Available classes 
Participating bands are assigned to a competitive classes based on their school's enrollment (grades 10 through 12). Classes are used to determine preliminary placements and awards and are not announced to the judges or audience with the intention to not influence scoring. The top twelve highest-scoring bands regardless of class advance to the finals performance. Class champions who do not advance to finals are invited to perform in exhibition. Bands of America attempts to keep the number of competing bands in each class, across the entire championship system, evenly distributed. Classes AA, AAA, and AAAA are realigned every three years based on data provided by participating bands. Class A's requirement of 600 or fewer enrolled students remains unchanged. The next realignment period is scheduled for 2024. The following classes are available :

Historic classes 
Competitive classes available from 1976 to the present. Classes were realigned in 1980, 1986, and in 2009.

Adjudication 
The adjudication system used by Bands of America is a single-tier "criteria reference system, in which a band showing proficiency in particular criteria, or meeting certain criteria at a certain level." Each adjudicator is assigned a specific category, or caption. Judges are assigned a specific area in which he or she focuses - in the press box or on the field. Bands will receive a recorded evaluation and scoresheet from each judge. The system has a strong emphasis on the Music General Effect, which accounts for 40% of the total score, as scores for Individual and Ensemble performance are averaged for both Music and Visual categories. According to the Adjudication Handbook a band's achievement (total score) is based on the content of the performance, as well as the quality of the performance. The Ensemble and Individual Performance scores in each category are averaged.

The manual and contest procedures utilized by Bands of America have been licensed to or adopted whole, or in part, by other organizations hosting marching band competitions. As a result, Bands of America functions as a de facto governing body who determines the adjudication and competitive attributes of marching band competitions throughout the United States. However, Bands of America is not organized as a governing body. It instead operates almost exclusively as an event promoter, producer, host, and music education advocacy organization. Changes to the attributes of Bands of America championships are made by the Music for All board of directors, who regularly appoint an advisory committee composed of directors from participating bands to provide input on all aspects of Bands of America's programs and events.

Past champions

Grand National Championships (1976–present) 
From 1976 to 1979, Grand National Championships were hosted at the University of Wisconsin–Whitewater in June of each year. In 1980, the Grand National Championships weekend transitioned to November where it has remained since. The class system was realigned in 1980, 1986, and in 2009.

Summer National Championships (1980–1989) 
In 1980, the Summer Workshop and Festival was relaunched as the Summer National Championship. The 1989 Summer National Champion, Christian Brothers, was a combined band representing four schools from the Chicago metro-area: Brother Rice, Mother McAuley, St. Laurence, and Queen of Peace high schools. Below is an incomplete list of champions:

See also 
 Mid-America Competing Band Directors Association (MACDBA)
 Tournament of Bands (TOB)
 Western Band Association (WBA, formerly WSMBC)

Notes

References

External links 
 

High school marching bands from the United States
Music organizations based in the United States
Educational organizations based in the United States
Organizations established in 1975
Non-profit organizations based in Indianapolis
Marching band competitions